Rosalind Groenewoud (born December 10, 1989) is a Canadian freeskier. She is the 2011 FIS World Champion in halfpipe, Groenewoud is also a 2012 Winter X Games champion x 2 (Aspen and Tignes) and has 3 silver and two bronze medals from X Games competitions in halfpipe.  She won the AFP Overall Championship in 2009 & 2010 and AFP Halfpipe Overall Ranking in 2012. She is the first woman to design her own pro-model freestyle ski with the female owned ski company Coalition Snow.

Career
Groenewoud won the gold medal in the halfpipe at the 2011 FIS Freestyle World Ski Championships. When Groenewoud won gold during the 2012 Winter X Games in Aspen and in Tignes, she dedicated her wins to teammate Sarah Burke who died in January 2012 in a training run. During 2013, Groenewoud was considered among the top female skiers in her sport and as such was a favourite to win gold in the new Olympic sport of halfpipe at the 2014 Winter Olympics in Sochi. During the 2012–13 FIS Freestyle Skiing World Cup she finished second at the stop in Sochi that was considered the last test event at the location before the Olympics.

Prior to the 2014 Winter Olympics Groenewoud required surgery on both her knees in part to an injury that occurred earlier in December. Despite this, she qualified for Canada's team at the Olympics. Two weeks before the Olympics, Groenewoud successfully competed at the X-Games '14 where she won the silver medal in the superpipe competition. Groenewoud finished seventh in her event's Olympic debut at Sochi 2014.

Personal
Groenewoud was a close friend and teammate for 7 years of deceased Sarah Burke whom she considers her inspiration. She carried her name on her helmet in all competitions. She studied math and physics at Quest University and is currently a medical student at the University of British Columbia. She is a member of the Target action sports team.  Her Olympic sponsors were P&G, RBC, Visa, General Mills, Bell Canada, BMW Canada.

References

External links

 
 
 
 
 

1989 births
Living people
Canadian female freestyle skiers
Skiers from Calgary
X Games athletes
Freestyle skiers at the 2014 Winter Olympics
Freestyle skiers at the 2018 Winter Olympics
Olympic freestyle skiers of Canada